Yuri Aleksandrovich Aksenov (born 11 August 1973) is a former Kazakhstani professional footballer.

Career
He made his professional debut in the Soviet Second League in 1990 for FC Tekstilshchik Kamyshin. He played for the main squad of FC Rotor Volgograd in the Russian Cup.

Honours
 Russian Cup finalist: 1995.
 Kazakhstan Premier League champion: 2000, 2001.

References

1973 births
Sportspeople from Volgograd
Living people
Russian footballers
Soviet footballers
Kazakhstani footballers
Kazakhstan international footballers
Russian Premier League players
Kazakhstan Premier League players
FC Tekstilshchik Kamyshin players
FC Rotor Volgograd players
FC Energiya Volzhsky players
FC Elista players
FC Zhenis Astana players
FC Kairat players
FC Vostok players
FC Kristall Smolensk players
Russian expatriate sportspeople in Ukraine
FC Dynamo Kyiv players
FC Dynamo-2 Kyiv players
Association football midfielders